Chetek Southworth Municipal Airport , also known as Chetek Municipal–Southworth Airport, is a city-owned public-use airport located one nautical mile (2 km) southeast of the central business district of Chetek, a city in Barron County, Wisconsin, United States.

Facilities and aircraft 
It has two runways: 17/35 with a 3,401 x 60 ft (1,036 x 18 m) asphalt pavement and 7/25 with a 1,490 x 120 ft (454 x 37 m) turf surface.

For the 12-month period ending July 23, 2020, the airport had 7,240 aircraft operations, an average of 19 per day: 99% general aviation and 1% air taxi. In January 2023, there were 47 aircraft based at this airport: 37 single-engine, 6 multi-engine and 4 ultralight.

See also 
 List of airports in Wisconsin

References

External links 
 at Wisconsin DOT airport directory

Airports in Wisconsin
Buildings and structures in Barron County, Wisconsin